James Shanahan (born August 7, 1977), known professionally as Jamey Jasta, is an American vocalist, best known as the lead singer of metalcore band Hatebreed and sludge metal band Kingdom of Sorrow. Jasta also fronts metalcore band Icepick. Prior to Hatebreed, he fronted the hardcore band Jasta 14.

Jasta owns Stillborn Records, a hardcore- and metal-based record label from West Haven, Connecticut, and a "rock-themed apparel" line called Hatewear.

In 2011, Jasta released a solo album titled Jasta, collaborating with Randy Blythe and Mark Morton (Lamb of God), Zakk Wylde, Philip Labonte (All That Remains), and Tim Lambesis (As I Lay Dying).

Jasta was the host for MTV's Headbangers Ball from 2003 to 2007.

Jasta created the music for "Stat of the Day" for the nationally syndicated radio and television talk show The Dan Patrick Show. Jasta appeared on air with Dan Patrick on January 25, 2013, discussing the making of the song.

He, as of 2013, refrains from smoking, drinking, and doing drugs but does not affiliate himself with the straight edge subculture.

Jasta's debut solo album, Jasta, was released in July 2011 through eOne Music. In Europe, the album was released via Century Media Records. AllMusic scored the album 4 out of 5 stars, while Blabbermouth.net gave it 6.5 out of 10 stars.

In 2018, Jasta produced Dee Snider's fourth solo album, For the Love of Metal. He is also producing the follow-up that will be released in the summer of 2021.

Podcast 
On August 14, 2014, Jasta launched the Jasta Show podcast. He has interviewed guests such as Rob Halford, Vinnie Paul, Nick Diaz, Luis J. Gomez, Ice-T, and Kirk Hammett.

Jasta was also one of the hosts in the Chi Cheng's fundraiser song along with his bandmate and fellow guitarist Wayne Lozinak. The song was produced by Korn bassist Fieldy to help to contribute to the Cheng Family.

References

External links 
 
Jamey Jasta interview

1977 births
American heavy metal singers
Living people
Musicians from New Haven, Connecticut
Kingdom of Sorrow members
21st-century American singers
21st-century American male singers
American people of Irish descent